Sarah Galbraith Buxton (born March 23, 1965) is an American actress. She has appeared in films such as Lovelines (1984), The Sure Thing (1985) and Less than Zero (1987), as well as guest starred in a number of television shows in her early career. On television, Buxton is best known for playing female protagonist/heroine Annie Douglas Richards in the NBC soap opera Sunset Beach from 1997 to 1999. She later played soap villain, Morgan DeWitt, on The Bold and the Beautiful (2000–01, 2005).

Career
Buxton was a competitive gymnast in her youth, until being "discovered" at the grocery store when she was about 15. In early 1980s, she began appearing on television and films. She guest-starred on Simon & Simon, 21 Jump Street, Who's the Boss?, The Fresh Prince of Bel-Air, China Beach and Walker, Texas Ranger. She also has appeared in a number of films, include Lovelines (1984), The Sure Thing (1985), Less than Zero (1987), Rock 'n' Roll High School Forever (1991), and Don't Tell Mom the Babysitter's Dead (1991).

Buxton is primarily known for her performance in the NBC daytime soap opera Sunset Beach, which aired from January 6, 1997 to December 31, 1999. Buxton was an original cast member and remained with the show for its entire run, playing the reformed Annie Douglas Richards opposite Lesley-Anne Down and Sam Behrens.  For her portrayal of Annie, Buxton was nominated in the category of "Outstanding heroine" at the 1998 Soap Opera Digest Awards. Justine Elias of The New York Times said Buxton and Anne Down showed signs of "becoming a classic matchup of battling soap opera vixens" in the respective roles of Annie and Olivia. Henry Mietkiewicz of the Toronto Star said that Annie "crowed gracelessly" during her scenes and opined that Buxton had a tendency to "shrilly overplay" Annie.

After the demise of Sunset Beach, Buxton joined the cast of the CBS soap opera The Bold and the Beautiful. She was regular from 2000 to 2001 as the less than sane villainess Morgan DeWitt, and in 2005, she returned to that role. In addition, she played a minor character, porn star Crystal Chablis, on the soap opera Days of Our Lives in 2004. After returning to The Bold and the Beautiful in March 2005 and signing a year-long contract, Buxton's run ended abruptly after just one month. In 2005, Buxton was considered for the coveted role of Carly Corinthos on General Hospital.

Buxton has appeared in the critically acclaimed films The Climb (1999) starring alongside John Hurt, and Little Children (2006). She also starred alongside Steven Seagal in the 2005 action film Today You Die, and has appeared in films Devil's Highway, Bedtime Stories, and Spread. On television, she has guest starred on CSI: Crime Scene Investigation, NYPD Blue, Criminal Minds and Glee.

Buxton's company TUTUblue markets UV-protective swimwear, which she pitched during the 7th season, episode 18 of Shark Tank.

Personal life
Buxton was born in Sacramento County, California. She lives in Beverly Hills with her husband, Irish actor Shane Brolly. The couple married on November 27, 2006. On December 20, 2006, Sarah gave birth to the couple's first child, a boy named Finn Michael Brolly.

Filmography

Film

Television

References

External links

Actresses from the San Francisco Bay Area
American film actresses
American soap opera actresses
American television actresses
Living people
20th-century American actresses
21st-century American actresses
1965 births